Brunswick County Early College High School is a high school located on the Brunswick Community College campus in Bolivia, North Carolina.

References

Public high schools in North Carolina
Schools in Brunswick County, North Carolina